National Air Cargo Group, Inc., also operating as National Airlines, is a United States airline based in Orlando, Florida. It operates on-demand cargo and passenger charter services. It added scheduled passenger service on December 16, 2015 from its hub at Orlando Sanford International Airport, Orlando.

History
The airline was established in 1985 and started operations in December 1986. It began with Mitsubishi MU-2 aircraft, which it developed for cargo use. In April 2005, Murray Air and its sister company, Murray Aviation, merged operations under Murray Airs newly acquired Part 121 certificate. In December 2008, after the airline was acquired by National Air Cargo, Murray Air changed its name to National Airlines, and operates under the National Air Cargo Group, Inc. umbrella.

National Airlines previously operated scheduled charter passenger flights from Oakland County International Airport to Kokomo Municipal Airport in Kokomo, Indiana; Chicago Rockford International Airport in Rockford, Illinois; Spirit of St. Louis Airport in St. Louis, Missouri; and Toronto Pearson International Airport in Toronto, Ontario, Canada (with some flights making intermediate stops at Willow Run Airport in Ypsilanti, Michigan). Flights were focused on Chrysler Corporation employees, but the airline also sold seats on those flights to the general public. These flights were operated by Saab 340 and BAe Jetstream 31 propjet aircraft in 30-seat and 19-seat configurations, respectively. This service is no longer operational.

On the cargo side, National Airlines operated two Douglas DC-8-63CFs (N921R/N865F) and one Douglas DC-8-71F (N872CA) on scheduled and charter operations worldwide, and later replaced one of the DC-8-63CF's with a DC-8-73F (N155CA). In April 2009, the carrier began cargo flights from Ypsilanti, Michigan, to Bagram Air Force Base in Afghanistan; the flights were extended to Kandahar International Airport in August of that year. This service was discontinued in 2010, with the last working flight for the DC-8 with National taking place in May 2012. During the summer of 2010, the airline purchased three Boeing 747-400BCFs. These aircraft were operated for the airline by Air Atlanta Icelandic initially, before being registered in the United States in 2011.

In May 2011, National leased a Boeing 757-200 in an all-passenger configuration and began operating the aircraft in an on-demand charter basis from Dubai. The airline added a second Boeing 757 during the spring of 2013 that was also used for charters in Dubai.

Originally based at Willow Run Airport in Ypsilanti, Michigan, the company moved in 2012 to Orlando, Florida.

In September, 2015, National announced scheduled passenger service from its hub at Orlando Sanford International Airport using their two active 757s. They announced destinations that include St. John's International Airport in St. John's, Newfoundland and Labrador, Canada; Windsor International Airport in Windsor, Ontario, Canada; Vancouver International Airport in Vancouver, British Columbia, Canada; and Luis Muñoz Marín International Airport in San Juan, Puerto Rico.

In March 2016, National was slated to start 757 service from Long Island MacArthur Airport in Ronkonkoma, NY to Puerto Rico. However the service was delayed, then cancelled and never operated due to "lack of aircraft."

Corporate affairs

National Air Cargo has its headquarters in Orchard Park, New York. The National Airlines division has its offices in Orlando, Florida.

At one time the airline had its headquarters at Willow Run Airport near Ypsilanti, Michigan. At the airport, the headquarters were in hangar space. When it was located at Ypsilanti, National Airlines had 79 employees, including administrative staff, purchasing staff, and crew schedulers at the headquarters.

On the week of January 29, 2013, the airline National Airlines completed its move from the Ypsilanti area to Orlando. The airline said that it planned to offer 105 jobs at Orlando, with 26 more than were available in Michigan. 44 of the 79 existing employees were having relocation plans. The airline wanted to move its staff into Class A office space as opposed to the previous hangar space. According to Garrett Matyas, the company's human resources director, the company originally considered Ann Arbor, Michigan, and was in talks with the Michigan Economic Development Corp. Instead, Matyas said that the airline moved to Florida due to an environment friendly towards business interests.

The state offered tax incentives for the Orlando location. According to Declan Reiley, the Metro Orlando Economic Development Commission vice president of business development, the airline also moved to Florida because two of the owners of the company were Florida residents. The freighter and passenger divisions are involved with contract military airlift operations. The New Zealand Defence Force (NZDF) indefinitely postponed using National Airlines for its airlift requirements after Flight 102 crashed.

Fleet
, National Airlines operates the following aircraft:

Former fleet
National Airlines formerly operated the following aircraft:

British Aerospace Jetstream 31
CASA C-212 Aviocar
Douglas DC-8-63AF
Douglas DC-8-71F
Douglas DC-8-73CF
Lockheed L-100 Hercules
Mitsubishi MU-2
Saab 340A
Tupolev Tu-204-100C

Accidents and incidents

On April 29, 2013, at approximately 3:30 p.m. Afghanistan time (11:00 UTC), National Airlines Flight 102, a Boeing 747-400BCF, registration N949CA, operating a charter cargo flight for Coalition forces, crashed soon after takeoff from Bagram Airfield in Afghanistan. All seven crew members on board died in the crash.

Although Taliban spokesmen claimed responsibility for the destruction of the aircraft, initial reports based on communications from the crew after takeoff indicated that the crash probably resulted from a load shift, causing the aircraft to experience a high-aft center of gravity, becoming unstable and eventually leading to the loss of control by the pilots. On Sep 14th 2015 the NTSB released their final report concluding the probable cause of the crash was:

"National Airlines' inadequate procedures for restraining special cargo loads, which resulted in the loadmaster’s improper restraint of the cargo, which moved aft and damaged hydraulic systems Nos. 1 and 2 and horizontal stabilizer drive mechanism components, rendering the airplane uncontrollable."

On October 29, 2016, the St. John's Airport Authority seized one of the aircraft of National Airlines passenger operations (N176CA, a 757), alleging non-payment for services at the airport during operations there. This was quickly followed by an announcement by the airline that they are cancelling operations into Newfoundland and Labrador as of January 6, 2017, and are also cancelling the substantial majority of flights scheduled for that route between October and the end of service. A hearing was held concerning the claim. National Airlines paid the St. John's Airport authority $182,000 for the services and the airport returned the 757 to National Airlines on October 31, 2016.

See also 
 List of defunct airlines of the United States

References

External links

National Air Cargo
National Airlines
National Airlines (archive)

 
Airlines established in 1985
Cargo airlines of the United States
Charter airlines of the United States
Companies based in Washtenaw County, Michigan
Ypsilanti, Michigan
Airlines based in Florida
Companies based in Orlando, Florida
1985 establishments in Michigan